Trisopterus luscus (bib, pout whiting, pout or most commonly pouting) is a seafish belonging to the cod family (Gadidae).

Distribution, size and life cycle
Pouting are found predominantly in European waters, especially around the south and west of the British Isles and in Scandinavian waters, although they can also be found in the Mediterranean and along the north African coast. They can be found across rocky and sandy seabeds with smaller specimens being found close to the shore and larger pouting being moving further offshore. The greatest depths at which pouting can be found is 300 metres. Pouting are generally a small fish, seldom exceeding 30 centimetres in length, although rare specimens can reach almost double this length. Pouting can reproduce before they reach two years of age and grow rapidly, reaching around 15 centimetres in length by the end of their first year. Pouting are a relatively short lived species, with the average lifespan thought to be around four years.

Feeding and diet
Pouting are scavengers which feed on the seabed. They forage for any food source they can find with marine worms, shellfish and dead fish all making up their diet. Due to their small size pouting are a source of prey for large species such as cod, bass and conger eels.

Commercial value
Pouting were previously ignored as a commercial fish, with pouting that were inadvertently caught by trawlers being either discarded at sea or processed into fishmeal. Captured pouting are unlikely to survive when discarded. However, the decline in the stocks of whitefish species such as cod and haddock has seen pouting acquire a growing value as a commercial fish, and they are now available both as whole fish from fishmongers and supermarkets and are also used in fish products such as fish fingers and ready meals. Due to their naturally short lifespan and early breeding age pouting are seen as a relatively sustainable fish to eat.

References

External links
 

Gadidae
Commercial fish
Fish described in 1758
Fish of the Atlantic Ocean
Fish of the Mediterranean Sea
Taxa named by Carl Linnaeus
Taxobox binomials not recognized by IUCN